"Little L" is the lead single from British funk-acid jazz band Jamiroquai's fifth studio album, A Funk Odyssey (2001). The song was written by Jay Kay and Toby Smith and was inspired by the breakup between Kay and his former girlfriend, Denise van Outen, over his cocaine problem. "Little L" was released on 13 August 2001, reaching number one in Spain, number two in Italy, and number five in the United Kingdom, Finland, and Portugal. The video features Jay Kay dancing in a futuristic nightclub.

Track listings

UK CD single
 "Little L" (single edit)
 "Little L" (Wounded Buffalo Remix)
 "Little L" (Bob Sinclar Remix)
 "Little L" (Boris Dlugosch Mix)
 "Little L" (video)

UK 12-inch single
A1. "Little L" (single edit)
A2. "Little L" (Wounded Buffalo Remix)
B1. "Little L" (Bob Sinclar Remix)
B2. "Little L" (Boris Dlugosch Mix)

UK cassette single
 "Little L" (single edit)
 "Little L" (Wounded Buffalo Remix)

Australian CD single
 "Little L" (single edit)
 "Little L" (Bob Sinclar Remix) – 7:26
 "Little L" (Boris Dlugosch Mix)
 "Little L" (Boris Dlugosch Dub)

US CD single
 "Little L" (single edit) – 3:57
 "Little L" (Bob Sinclair Remix) – 7:26
 "Little L" (Boris Dlugosch Mix) – 6:14
 "Little L" (Blaze Shelter Mix) – 6:18
 "You Give Me Something" (Full Intention Club Mix) – 7:11

Charts and certifications

Weekly charts

Year-end charts

Certifications

Release history

References

2001 singles
2001 songs
Columbia Records singles
Jamiroquai songs
Music videos directed by Stéphane Sednaoui
Number-one singles in Spain
Songs written by Jason Kay
Songs written by Toby Smith
S2 Records singles